Australian Tour EP 2008 is an EP by Mondo Generator containing a mix of studio, acoustic, and live material.  It was released to coincide with their first Australian tour in August 2008. The live tracks feature an early lineup from 2004.

Track listing
 "Lie Detector"
 "You Can't Put Your Arms Around a Memory"
 "Autopilot (Acoustic)"
 "Eccentric Man (Live)"
 "Unless I Can Kill (Live)"
 "Simple Exploding Man (Live)"

"Lie Detector" is taken directly from their album Dead Planet
"You Can't Put Your Arms Around A Memory" is a Johnny Thunders cover song

Personnel
Lie Detector
Nick Oliveri – Vocals, Guitar, Bass
Ben Thomas – Drums (not credited)
Ben Perrier – Guitar (not credited)
Mark Diamond – Lead Guitar
Hoss is wrongly credited with drums
You Cant Put Your Arms Around a Memory
Nick Oliveri – Vocals, Guitar
Autopilot
Mark Lanegan – Vocals
Nick Oliveri – Guitar, background Vocals
Curly Jobson – Guitar
Eccentric Man
Nick Oliveri – Vocals, Bass
Mark Diamond – Guitar
Josh Lamar – Drums

Recorded Live at Reading Festival 2004

Unless I Can Kill
Nick Oliveri – Vocals
Dave Catching – Guitar
Molly McGuire – Bass
Brant Bjork – Drums

Recorded Live at Troubadour, Los Angeles 2003

Simple Exploding Man
Nick Oliveri – Vocals
Dave Catching – Guitar
Molly McGuire – Bass
Brant Bjork – Drums

Recorded Live at Troubadour, Los Angeles 2003

References 

Mondo Generator albums
2008 EPs
Impedance Records albums